Eşrefoğlu Mosque is a 13th-century mosque in Beyşehir, Konya Province, Turkey

History 

During the last years of Seljuks of Rum, various governors of Seljuks enjoyed a partial independency. They established their own semi independent principalities named Anatolian Beyliks. Eshrefids (1280-1326) was a small beylik in center west Anatolia. After 1288, Süleyman Bey, the second bey of Eshrefids rebuilt the city of Beyşehir as a capital of his beylik. Although his beylik was relatively an unimportant political power, the city flourished as one of the cultural centers of Seljuk world. In 1296, he commissioned a mosque in Beyşehir, one of the greatest mosques during the Anatolian beylik period. In 1302 he died and buried in a sepulcher next to the mosque.

Technical details 
The plan of the mosque is rectangular; . But the corner at the north east side is enlarged to make room for the main portal. There are two smaller gates and 35 windows. The roof is supported by 42 wooden columns.

After seven centuries, unlike most other Seljuk wooden buildings, this mosque survives and it is used for regular services. The wooden columns are made of cedar and according to oral tradition they were soaked in the Beyşehir lake for six months before being used in the building. At the center of the mosque there is a snow pit. Up to relatively recent times (1940s), the pit was used to be filled with snow from the nearby mountains. This snow both cooled the mosque during the summers and supplied the necessary humidity to the wooden infrastructure.

Unesco World Heritage Tentative list 

On 15 April 2011 the mosque was included in the list of World Heritage tentative list. The justification statements is "Esrefoglu Mosque includes all the main elements of early Anatolian Turkish architecture. The building is the biggest, best preserved wooden columned and roofed mosque in Islamic World."

See also
 List of Turkish Grand Mosques

Gallery

References

History of Konya Province
Tourist attractions in Konya Province
Seljuk mosques in Turkey
World Heritage Tentative List for Turkey
Mosques completed in 1299
Anatolian Beyliks architecture